Hiroaki Okuno may refer to:

, Japanese volleyball player
, Japanese football player